Deorkothar (Devanāgarī: also Deur Kothar) is a location of archaeological importance in Madhya Pradesh, Central India. It is known for its Buddhist stupas and was discovered in 1982.These stupas are credited to the Mauryan emperor, Ashoka.

The discovery and excavations
P.K. Mishra (Archaeological Survey of India) discovered Deorkothar in 1982 along with Ajit Singh, sarpanch of village Barhat. It was declared a monument of national importance in 1988 by the Govt of India and is being preserved and conserved by Archaeological Survey of India, Bhopal.

Realising the importance of the site, and its likely international bearing on Buddhism, the Archaeological Survey of India decided to carry out extensive, but controlled, excavations at the site. The excavations were started at the site in 1999 and continued up to 2000. The site is marked by four stupa mounds out of which two stupas No. 1 and 2 were subjected to archaeological excavations. There are remnants of 40 stupas made of stones or bricks. In the area around there are rocks with old rock paintings. Some rocks have inscriptions in Brahmi language.

Deorkothar inscription
The six line Brahmi inscription on the Deorkothar pillar is considered to be the earliest evidence of the historic Buddha. It is given in the table – transliterated into Devanagari script.
भ ग व तो बु ध
उ त र मि त्रो उ त र मि त्र स अ
भ ड्‍ भ ड्‍ स आ ते वा सि ना दि नु
उ पा स क स आ ते वा सि स व ज य स व
ध म द वे न के क डी के न ब स ति ये
उ स पि तो भं भो आ आ च रि ये न क सि 

The inscription mentions Buddha on the first line. The gist of the inscription, pertains to the erection and dedication of stone pillar by an unnamed Upasaka and his disciples in memory of the Buddha, the enlightened one.

The inscription speaks about an Acharya, named Dharamdev, and his three disciples – Uttarmitra, Bhadra and Upasaka, who used to reside in the monastery. They installed this pillar, dedicating it to the Buddha.

See also
 Decline of Buddhism in India
 Buddhism in India
 Buddhist architecture
 Bharhut
 Sanchi
 Recently found Buddhist remains in region near Bharhut and Sanchi

Footnotes

References
Dainik Bhaskar, Satna, 13 September 2006
P.K. Mishra: Deorkothar (Barhat), Rewa, A Unique, Recently – Excavated Buddhist Site in Central India; Archaeological Survey of India, Bhopal.

External links
DEORKOTHAR : A MILESTONE OF HISTORY, Dr. P.K. Mishra
The Buddha Bounces Back By Eric Powell: DISCOVER Vol. 22 No. 07 | July 2001
Excavations at the Buddhist site of Deor-Kothar (Barhat), District Rewa, Madhya Pradesh, India, 1999-2001 PK Misra - Circle of Inner Asian Art Newsletter, 2001

Buildings and structures in Madhya Pradesh
Buddhist temples in India
History of Madhya Pradesh
Mauryan art
Stupas in India
Rewa, Madhya Pradesh
Archaeological sites in Madhya Pradesh
Buddhist sites in Madhya Pradesh
Rock shelters
Tourist attractions in Rewa district